Heikki Vestman (born 8 April 1985, in Kerava) is a Finnish politician currently serving in the Parliament of Finland for the National Coalition Party at the Uusimaa constituency.

References

1985 births
Living people
People from Kerava
National Coalition Party politicians
Members of the Parliament of Finland (2019–23)